The 1933–34 Detroit Red Wings season was the eighth season for the Detroit NHL franchise, second as the Red Wings. The Red Wings finished first in the American Division to qualify for the playoffs.

Offseason

Regular season

Final standings

Record vs. opponents

Schedule and results

Playoffs

(C1) Toronto Maple Leafs vs. (A1) Detroit Red Wings

Detroit wins best-of-five series 3–2.

(A1) Detroit Red Wings vs. (A2) Chicago Black Hawks

Chicago wins the Stanley Cup 3–1.

Player statistics

Regular season
Scoring

Goaltending

Playoffs
Scoring

Goaltending

Note: GP = Games played; G = Goals; A = Assists; Pts = Points; +/- = Plus-minus PIM = Penalty minutes; PPG = Power-play goals; SHG = Short-handed goals; GWG = Game-winning goals;
      MIN = Minutes played; W = Wins; L = Losses; T = Ties; GA = Goals against; GAA = Goals-against average;  SO = Shutouts;

Awards and records

Transactions

See also
1933–34 NHL season

References

Bibliography

External links
 

Detroit Red Wings seasons
Detroit
Detroit
Detroit Red Wings
Detroit Red Wings